Rockstar North Limited (formerly DMA Design Limited) is a British video game development company and a studio of Rockstar Games based in Edinburgh. The company was founded as DMA Design in Dundee in 1987 by David Jones, soon hiring former classmates Mike Dailly, Russell Kay, and Steve Hammond. During its early years, DMA Design was backed by its publisher Psygnosis, primarily focusing on Amiga, Atari ST and Commodore 64 games. During this time, they created successful shooters such as Menace, and Blood Money, but soon turned to platform games after the release of Lemmings in 1991, which was an international success and led to several sequels and spin-offs. After developing Unirally for Nintendo, DMA Design was set to become one of their main second-party developers, but this partnership ended after Nintendo's disapproval of Body Harvest.

In 1997, DMA released Grand Theft Auto, which was a huge success; the game sparked a successful series. The company was soon acquired by Gremlin Interactive. Following the release of Grand Theft Auto 2, Gremlin was acquired by Infogrames. After the Infogrames acquisition, the DMA Design assets were sold to Take-Two Interactive. In 2001, after the release of Grand Theft Auto III, DMA Design was ultimately renamed Rockstar North and became part of the Rockstar Games label. After the shift, the company worked on new titles, including Manhunt, provided support to other Rockstar games such as Red Dead Redemption and Max Payne 3, and continued the Grand Theft Auto franchise with Grand Theft Auto IV (2008) and Grand Theft Auto V (2013). Both games are considered to be among the best video games made, and Grand Theft Auto V became the second-best-selling game of all time. Leslie Benzies headed the studio since the Take-Two acquisition until his departure in 2016.

History

DMA Design

Background (1984–1986) 

In 1984, David Jones, Russell Kay, Steve Hammond and Mike Dailly often met at the Kingsway Amateur Computer Club (KACC) in Dundee. While Jones used an Amiga 1000, the others used Sinclair Spectrum or Commodore 64. They developed numerous small games while attending the KACC: Jones and Kay developed Moonshadow (eventually renamed Zone Trooper), Daily developed Freek Out, and Jones and Dailly collaborated on The Game With No Name. When later attending the Dundee Institute of Technology, Jones began development on a game tentatively titled CopperCon1, working under the temporary name "Acme Software", alongside Kay, Hammond and Dailly. To publish the game, Jones first approached Hewson Consultants, where Andrew Braybrook played and recommended the game. When Jones was informed that Hewson wanted the game to be the "Amiga version of Zynaps", he realised that sales would be limited, and refused to sign the contract, instead signing a deal with publisher Psygnosis. The game was renamed Draconia, with Tony Smith working on graphics and Jones designing levels.

Early games and Lemmings (1987–1993) 
By 1987, Jones wanted to incorporate the company but found that the name "Acme" was already taken by a design company. As he had to choose another, he considered to use "Visual Voyage" and "Alias Smith and Jones", but ultimately decided to go with "DMA Design". The "DMA" was taken from Amiga programming manuals, where it stood for direct memory access, though the "DMA" in the company's name had no meaning. DMA Design was formally founded by Jones that same year. Draconia was renamed Menace, and it was published in 1988 for Amiga, and in 1989 for Atari ST, Commodore 64 and MS-DOS. This was followed by Blood Money, a side-scrolling shooter which began development in January 1989. The game was in development for five months, and was released for Amiga and Atari ST in May 1989. The game was ported to MS-DOS by Tim Ansell of Creative Assembly in 1989, and to Commodore 64 by Dailly in 1990. The company was also assigned to porting Ballistix to MS-DOS and Commodore 64. Jones began developing the side-scrolling shooter Walker in 1989, following the release of Blood Money.

Also in 1989, Dailly became DMA Design's first employee. In early 1990, Jones scrapped Walker and began development on a new game called Gore!; this was soon scrapped. By the end of the year, Jones hired Ian Dunlop and Niall Glancey to continue working on Walker; Glancey redesigned the game, and it was released for Amiga in 1993. In 1990, Jones hired Tony Colgan to develop Cutiepoo, and assist with Gore! before its cancellation. By the end of the year, Jones was irritated by the lack of progress on Cutiepoo, cancelling the game and firing Colgan as a result. In June 1990, DMA was commissioned by Psygnosis to port Shadow of the Beast to the TurboGrafx-16 and Commodore 64; Dailly developed the former, while Richard Swinfen and Steve Hammond worked on the latter. Psygnosis teamed with Ocean Software to publish Shadow of the Beast for Commodore 64 Games System; Swinfen and Hammond adapted accordingly. Swinfen, who was subcontracted for his work on the game, found it unfair that Jones was getting paid for the game, despite not working on it; the two never worked again. DMA also released Hired Guns for Amiga and MS-DOS in 1993, designed by Hammond and Scott Johnston.

DMA's major breakthrough came with 1991's Lemmings, a dynamic puzzle game originally released for Amiga in February 1991. The game ultimately sold over 15 million copies, and received numerous ports to different consoles. The game led to numerous sequels by DMA: Oh No! More Lemmings (1991), Lemmings 2: The Tribes (1993), and All New World of Lemmings (1994), as well as two Christmas Lemmings (1993–94). It also spawned various Lemmings games by other developers, such as 3D Lemmings (1995) and Lemmings Revolution (2000). Revenues from Lemmings allowed the company to expand, adding their own motion capture studio and a division called DMA Music, consisting of the team's in-house musicians.

Nintendo arrangement and acquisitions (1994–2002) 
Following Sony's acquisition of Psygnosis in 1993, DMA signed with Nintendo to publish Unirally in 1994. DMA then spent six months studying development for the 3DO Interactive Multiplayer, but they cancelled all their plans for the console when the success of Unirally led Nintendo to offer to publish an original DMA game for the upcoming Ultra 64 console (later renamed Nintendo 64). In response, DMA created Body Harvest, an action-adventure third-person shooter. Originally intended as a launch game for Nintendo 64 in 1996, Body Harvest received numerous delays following Nintendo's various issues with the content. Nintendo ultimately scrapped the game, which was later published by Midway Games and Gremlin Interactive in September 1998.

Around 1995, DMA Design was developing Kid Kirby, an entry in the Kirby series for the Super Nintendo Entertainment System intended to utilise the Super NES Mouse; the game's slow development and the poor sales of the Super NES Mouse eventually led to the project's cancellation. DMA Design began developing a new game, Race'n'Chase, in April 1995. The development team consisted of mostly inexperienced members, who struggled with the task until producer and creative director Gary Penn joined the project. Originally scheduled for release in late 1996, the game was ultimately released as Grand Theft Auto in November 1997 for Microsoft Windows, following many development issues. The game was a critical and commercial success, and ultimately spawned a successful series.

Game development at DMA Design generally involved taking risks and being unique. When an idea was pitched within the company, the question "What's different about it?" was asked; the team wished to make unique and innovative games, rather than mimicking the trend. By doing this, they found that they were taking risks in the business, witnessing the market reactions and seeking respect from players. The company also strongly valued the development of the games, as opposed to business and marketing. "It doesn't matter if we were owned by somebody or if we were as we are, we'd still just write games", said Jones.

Jones has expressed his distaste of linear gameplay. "I just love games that are pretty open-ended; you can try things, you can go wherever you want", he said. He claims that this distaste is reflected in the games by DMA Design, including the options available to players in Lemmings and the open world of Grand Theft Auto. DMA Design had a fairly open office space for the developers. "There was this fantastic 'try it out and see' attitude," said developer Gary Timmons. Following his departure from the studio, Kay said that the team members "know each other pretty well and understand each other's strengths and weaknesses".

BMG Interactive, publisher of Grand Theft Auto, were bought by Take-Two Interactive in March 1998 for 1.85 million company shares, around 16% of their common stock, and some staff, including Sam and Dan Houser, were carried across to Rockstar Games, which was formed as a subsidiary of Take-Two Interactive in December 1998. During the changes in management, DMA Design lost many employees, including Kay, Hammond and Dailly. Several games were also scrapped during this time, including Nintendo 64 ports of Grand Theft Auto and Wild Metal Country, a 64DD port of Unreal (1998), and a game known as Attack!. Sam Houser, who became Rockstar Games' executive producer, said that "the ability to align Rockstar with a development house [...] that is clearly approaching video-game development in a new and exciting manner, makes this a perfect match".

Following the acquisition, it was announced that DMA Design would continue developing Grand Theft Auto games, including GTA3D and Grand Theft Auto: Online Crime World; the former was compared to the gameplay of Quake, while the latter was set to have worldwide servers allowing players to compete with others in local cities. The company received various staffing changes following the acquisition: Jones left the company and founded Realtime Worlds, while DMA Design was headed by Leslie Benzies and Andrew Semple, among others. The studio had about 25 employees at the time of the changeover. Under new management from Rockstar Games and Take-Two Interactive, DMA Design developed Grand Theft Auto III, which was released for PlayStation 2 in October 2001. In March 2002, DMA Design became Rockstar Studios, being integrated into Rockstar Games, and renamed to Rockstar North in May 2002.

Rockstar North

Grand Theft Auto and Manhunt (2002–2007) 
Grand Theft Auto: Vice City was released in October 2002 for PlayStation 2 after nine months of development. The game retained the engine and core gameplay of GTA III while adding a number of refinements and a roster of top Hollywood voice talent. In 2003, the company released a PC port of Vice City, as well as a two-pack of both Grand Theft Auto III and Vice City for Microsoft's Xbox console, ported by Rockstar Vienna. The developer's next release, also for PlayStation 2, was Manhunt in November 2003, after the studio refocused post Vice City. The game was released amidst a media frenzy surrounding some of the game's violent content.

Grand Theft Auto: San Andreas followed for PlayStation 2 in October 2004 and became the highest-selling PlayStation 2 game ever, with 17.33 million copies sold. It went on to sell 27.5 million copies total after ports to Xbox and PC were released in 2005. Following in 2005 and 2006 respectively, Liberty City Stories and Vice City Stories were two new instalments for PlayStation Portable, both developed by Rockstar Leeds under supervision from Rockstar North. Both games subsequently received ports to the PlayStation 2. After San Andreas was released, and due to growing staff numbers, the company moved from their Leith offices to a new location at Calton Square. Starting from an original team of around twenty-five, the studio now has over 360 staff.

Grand Theft Auto IV and V, and Benzies' departure (2008–present) 

Grand Theft Auto IV was released on 29 April 2008, after around four years of development, for both the Xbox 360 and PlayStation 3, marking the debut of the developer's wildly popular Grand Theft Auto franchise on the seventh-generation of video game consoles. GTA IV was another huge financial and critical success, breaking sales records amongst all types of entertainment media. Rockstar North continued work on GTA IV in the form of two pieces of downloadable episodic content. The first of these, The Lost and Damned, was released on 17 February 2009, with the second, The Ballad of Gay Tony, released on 29 October 2009. Rockstar Games later released a disc-based version of both episodes, Grand Theft Auto: Episodes from Liberty City, for Windows, PlayStation 3 and Xbox 360.

On 2 June 2009, at Sony's E3 conference, it was announced that Agent was being developed by Rockstar North for PlayStation 3. This was later confirmed in an interview with Ben Feder, President of Take-Two Interactive. It was announced that the game would be set in the world of the late 1970s. According to Rockstar North, it would "take players on a paranoid journey into the world of counter-intelligence, espionage, and political assassinations". The "Agent" trademark was abandoned in November 2018, and the game's website was deactivated by October 2021.

On 17 September 2013, the studio released Grand Theft Auto V on the Xbox 360 and PlayStation 3, which became one of the most critically acclaimed games ever. The game was a return to the fictional city of Los Santos, last seen in Grand Theft Auto: San Andreas. The game also introduced multiple playable characters for the first time in the series, allowing players to switch between Franklin, Michael and Trevor. It quickly became the studio's most commercially successful release, as well as one of the highest-grossing video games of all time, surpassing the total gross of Grand Theft Auto IV within its first week and breaking the one-day gross record for video games.

At the end of the year, Rockstar North agreed to take over rental of the  Barclay House on Holyrood Road, Edinburgh, which had been opened in 1999 as headquarters of The Scotsman newspaper group. After alteration work, Rockstar North moved into this building in 2014.

Following the release of Grand Theft Auto V, studio president and producer Leslie Benzies went on sabbatical on 1 September 2014, and left the company in January 2016; art directors Aaron Garbut and Rob Nelson took over Benzies' responsibilities at Rockstar North. Nelson later became co-studio head alongside Andrew Semple.

Benzies v. Take-Two Interactive Software, Inc. 
In a document revealed by his attorney, Benzies claimed not only that Rockstar Games had not paid the due royalties but also that he was drawn into a scheme inserted into a so-called "2009 Royalty Plan" where Benzies would earn evenly split profits between the three called "Rockstar North Principals" (Sam Houser, Dan Houser and Benzies), a coalition created for the three by Dan and Sam Houser to try to separate from Take-Two Interactive, using the company's funds to do so. When Benzies was due his split, he never received any money, given the Houser brothers had unknowingly allocated  in profit-sharing payments to themselves, with another  in profits still unaccounted for.

In 2014, Benzies was reportedly encouraged to take a sabbatical pause by the Houser brothers, in order to "recharge batteries", given how hard he had worked for the company during all the years it has existed. Benzies also accused the Houser brothers of being unable to work without his presence, by revealing e-mails during the Red Dead Redemption development troubles that showed Houser urgently asking for Benzies' help because he could not manage any big projects without him (in the case of Red Dead Redemption, having trouble finishing the project, whilst Benzies was not even allocated to work on the game), constantly pestering the ex-developer via e-mails asking for help, saying that nothing was the same without him, treating him like an extraordinarily necessary asset for the company, having him working on projects he wasn't even a part of. Sam Houser was also accused of orchestrating and encouraging "a company culture involving strip clubs, personal photography of employees in sexually compromising positions, and other conduct grossly in violation of standard workplace norms." On the evening of 12 April 2016, Take-Two counter-claimed Benzies' lawsuit, saying the accusations were "downright bizarre".

On 29 March 2018, Benzies' litigation against Rockstar and Take-Two suffered a significant setback when the companies succeeded in dismissing 12 out of 18 of his claims, though the court did rule that Benzies "remains entitled to receive certain royalties" as part of his compensation. Sometime in 2018, Take-Two levied a legal warning against Benzies' new company Royal Circus Games, citing the similarity of its acronym (RCG) to Rockstar Games (RSG) as infringement of intellectual property; due to this, Benzies later renamed his company Build a Rocket Boy Games in October 2018. Take-Two had also decried their employment of Rockstar North staff as a deceptive tactic to create an affiliation between them. On 7 February 2019, Benzies' litigation with Take-Two had officially come to an end. All parties involved in the case successfully executed a confidential settlement, with each agreeing to bear its own costs and expenses, including, without limitation, attorney's fees.

Tax relief practices 
TaxWatch UK, a UK-based investigative think tank, reported in July 2019 that Rockstar North had not paid any corporation tax between 2009 and 2018. Meanwhile, the studio received  in tax credits through the UK government's video games tax relief (VGTR) scheme, 19% of the scheme's entire payout since its establishment in 2014. In a statement released in January 2020, Rockstar Games stated that VGTR significantly supported the company's investments in the country. The company did not address the reported non-paying of corporation tax.

Games developed

As DMA Design

As Rockstar North

Development support

Unreleased 
 Agent (announced 2009)

Notes

References

External links 
 

1984 establishments in Scotland
British companies established in 1987
British subsidiaries of foreign companies
Companies based in Edinburgh
Golden Joystick Award winners
Grand Theft Auto
Rockstar Games subsidiaries
Scottish brands
Software companies of Scotland
Take-Two Interactive divisions and subsidiaries
Video game companies established in 1987
Video game companies of the United Kingdom
Video game development companies